1655 Comas Solà, provisional designation , is a rare-type asteroid from the central region of the asteroid belt, approximately 36 kilometers in diameter. It was discovered on 28 November 1929, by Spanish astronomer of Catalan origin, Josep Comas i Solà at the Fabra Observatory in Barcelona, Spain. It was later named after the discoverer.

Orbit and classification 

It orbits the Sun in the central main-belt at a distance of 2.1–3.4 AU once every 4 years and 8 months (1,693 days). Its orbit has an eccentricity of 0.24 and an inclination of 10° with respect to the ecliptic.

Physical characteristics 

Comas Solà shows as rare XFU-type and B-type spectrum in the Tholen and SMASS classification scheme, respectively.

Lightcurves 

A rotational lightcurve obtained by American amateur astronomer Robert Stephens gave a well-defined rotation period of 20.456 hours with a brightness variation of 0.20 magnitude.

Diameter and albedo 

According to the surveys carried out by the Infrared Astronomical Satellite IRAS, the Japanese Akari satellite, and NASA's Wide-field Infrared Survey Explorer with its subsequent NEOWISE mission, Comas Solà measures between 30.57 and 40 kilometers in diameter and its surface has an albedo between 0.04 and 0.073. More recently published revised WISE/NEOWISE-data gave a refined diameter of 35.6 and 35.94 kilometers, respectively. The Collaborative Asteroid Lightcurve Link agrees with IRAS, and adopts an albedo of 0.0726 with a diameter of 30.57 kilometers and an absolute magnitude of 11.04.

Naming 

This minor planet was named in memory of its discoverer Josep Comas i Solà (1868–1937), first director of the discovering Fabra Observatory, Barcelona, capital of the Catalonia region in northeastern Spain. He was a prolific observer of minor planets and comets in the 1920s.

It is one of the rare cases where a minor planet bears the name of its discoverer. Solà is also honored by the asteroid 1102 Pepita, named after his nickname, and by the 127-kilometer wide Martian crater Comas Sola. The official naming citation was published by the Minor Planet Center on 1 June 1980.

References

External links 
 Asteroid Lightcurve Database (LCDB), query form (info )
 Dictionary of Minor Planet Names, Google books
 Asteroids and comets rotation curves, CdR – Observatoire de Genève, Raoul Behrend
 Discovery Circumstances: Numbered Minor Planets (1)-(5000) – Minor Planet Center
 
 

001655
Discoveries by Josep Comas Solà
Named minor planets
001655
001655
19291128